Binghamton City Hall is a historic city hall located at Binghamton in Broome County, New York.

The building was designed by Ingle & Almirall in the Second Empire style. It is a five-story masonry structure with basement. The city hall was built in 1897–1898.  It features a mansard roof and prominent cupola.

The city hall is located within the boundaries of the Court Street Historic District.

It was listed on the National Register of Historic Places in 1971. In 1972 the city government moved to Government Plaza. After sitting vacant for a decade, The building was  converted to a hotel, and in 2020 to apartments.

References

External links

City Of Binghamton, New York

Buildings and structures in Binghamton, New York
Historic district contributing properties in New York (state)
Government buildings completed in 1897
City and town halls on the National Register of Historic Places in New York (state)
Historic American Buildings Survey in New York (state)
National Register of Historic Places in Broome County, New York
History of Broome County, New York
Second Empire architecture in New York (state)